Babhalgaon is a village in Latur district in the Indian state of Maharashtra.

Demographics

Notable people

 Amit Vilasrao Deshmukh - MLA
 Dhiraj Vilasrao Deshmukh - MLA
 Diliprao Deshmukh - Former state minister of sports & youth welfare

 Riteish Vilasrao Deshmukh - Actor
 Vilasrao Deshmukh - Former chief minister of Maharashtra

References

Latur district
Villages in Latur district
Neighbourhoods in Latur
Villages in Latur taluka

bn:বাভুলগাঁও
bpy:বাভুলগাঁও